This is a list of people from Manchester, a city in North West England. The demonym of Manchester is Mancunian. This list is arranged alphabetically by surname. For people from Greater Manchester see List of people from Greater Manchester.

A–F

 Daniel Adamson (1820–1890) engineer born in Durham who designed the Manchester Ship Canal; one of the directors of the Manchester chamber of commerce; Justice of the Peace for Cheshire and Manchester; buried in Withington
 Chris Addison stand-up comedian, writer and actor
 Mark Addy (1840–1890) Manchester-born Albert Medal recipient
 Caroline Aherne (1963–2016) BAFTA Award-winning actress, comedian and writer, The Mrs Merton Show
 William Harrison Ainsworth historical novelist born in Manchester
 Sir John Alcock aviator who, with fellow British aviator Arthur Brown, made the first nonstop transatlantic flight
 Adam Anderson  synthesist, one half of synth-pop duo Hurts
 Don Arden Cheetham Hill-born music manager and businessman, who oversaw the careers of rock groups Small Faces, Electric Light Orchestra and Black Sabbath
 Anthony Arthur (born 1973) Olympic weightlifter (1996 Summer Olympics)
 George Arthurs (1875–1944), songwriter and author
 Rob Atha table football player
 Mike Atherton former England cricket captain and commentator
 Norman Beaker born Norman Hume in 1950 in Longsight, blues guitarist, vocalist, songwriter, band leader and record producer, officially recognised and inducted as a Legend in the Blues Hall of Fame in 2017.
 William Worby Beaumont (1848–1929) automotive engineer and inventor
 Max Beesley English actor and musician
 Niamh Blackshaw actress, known for portraying Juliet Nightingale in Hollyoaks
 Stan Bowles born and brought up in Collyhurst; Manchester City, QPR, Nottingham Forest and England International footballer in the 1970s
Maud Boyd (1867–1929) actress and operatic singer
Edward Brotherton (1814–1866), English Swedenborgian and educational reform campaigner
Joe Brown born in Ardwick, climber and mountaineer
 Wes Brown former Manchester United footballer
 Anthony Burgess (1917–1993) Manchester-born and educated author, poet, playwright, musician, linguist, translator and critic, known for novel A Clockwork Orange
 Darren Campbell former sprinter representing Great Britain
 Thomas George Cassell YouTuber and Twitch streamer
 John Cassidy Irish-born sculptor and painter who lived in Manchester
 Tom Chantrell – designer of many film posters including The Sound of Music and Star Wars
 Sir Humphrey Chetham merchant and benefactor of Chetham's Library; born in Crumpsall
Stanley Chow artist and illustrator
 Oliver Claffey (born 1990)  professional wrestler
 Richard Cobden (1804–1865) Sussex-born industrialist who moved to Manchester, where he was politically active
 Kenneth Colley actor who played Admiral Piett in The Empire Strikes Back and Return of the Jedi
 Roy Collins (1934–2009) cricketer who played for Lancashire and Cheshire; born in Clayton
 Verona Conway (1910–1986), plant ecologist
 George Cooke (1826–1862), cricketer
 Mary Corkling, artist and food reformer, was born at Withington, Manchester, in 1850. 
 Lisa Cross (born 1978) IFBB professional bodybuilder
 Kevin Cummins  award-winning professional photographer, responsible for iconic Joy Division photographs and for charting the rise of punk rock and Britpop, born in Withington
 Peter Cundall, OA (1927–2021) horticulturist and television presenter; born in Manchester
 Ian Curtis (1956–1980) musician and singer in Joy Division
 Mark DaviesRoman Catholic Bishop of Shrewsbury
 Aaron Davis (born 1990)better known by his stage name Bugzy Malone, rapper and actor, first artist in the grime genre from Manchester to commercially succeed in the UK
 Les Dawson comedian, born in Collyhurst (1931–1993)
 Arthur Delaney painter influenced by L. S. Lowry
 Lee Dixon former professional footballer and ITV Sport football pundit
 DJ Semtex disc jockey and presenter for BBC Radio 1Xtra digital radio station, presenting the flagship hip-hop show Friday Nights
 Robert Donat film and stage actor; known for his roles in Alfred Hitchcock's The 39 Steps and Goodbye, Mr. Chips, for which he won an Academy Award for Best Actor
 Edith Escombe fiction writer and essayist
 Rachel Fairburn popular comedian and one half of the well known true crime serial killer comedy podcast All Killa No Filla
 Judy Finnigan television presenter and columnist; usually co-presents with her husband, Richard Madeley; they are collectively known as Richard and Judy
 Wayne Fontana  singer with The Mindbenders
 Norman Foster  architect; founder and chairman of Foster and Partners studios; raised in Levenshulme
 Dean Furman (born 1988) professional footballer

G–M

 Liam Gallagher lead singer of Manchester band Oasis; born in Burnage
 Noel Gallagher songwriter and lead guitarist for High Flying Birds and formerly Oasis; born in Burnage (older brother of Liam Gallagher)
 George Garrett submarine pioneer who built Resurgam; brought up in Moss Side
Michael Bisping  UFC Middleweight Champion
 Max George member of boy band the Wanted
 Andy Gibb British pop star, teen idol and actor
 Barry Gibb British pop musician, member of the Bee Gees; brought up in Chorlton
 Maurice Gibb British pop musician, member of the Bee Gees; brought up in Chorlton
 Robin Gibb  British pop singer, member of the Bee Gees; brought up in Chorlton
 Jimmy Golder English professional association footballer
 Jimi Goodwin bassist, vocalist and guitarist for the Doves
 Holliday Grainger Didsbury-born actress; known for portraying Lucrezia Borgia in Showtime's The Borgias
 Trevor Griffiths dramatist, co-writer of screenplay for the film Reds; born in Ancoats
 Nick Grimshaw Manchester-born Radio 1 DJ
 Andrew Hall Cheshire cricketer
 Arthur Harden Manchester-born Nobel Prize–winning biochemist
 Benjamin Heywood (1793–1865) prominent Manchester citizen, philanthropist and politician
 Oliver Heywood English banker and philanthropist
 Bernard Hill film, stage and television actor, known for playing Yosser Hughes in Boys from the Blackstuff and roles in blockbuster films, including Titanic, The Lord of the Rings film trilogy and True Crime
 Ray Honeyford headmaster and writer, known for highlighting the failures of multiculturalism in Bradford
 Keith HopwoodHerman's Hermits guitarist, born in Davyhulme
 Shotty Horroh well known rapper, singer and actor
 Myra Hindley Gorton-born serial killer who, along with her accomplice, Ian Brady, claimed the lives of five victims in Manchester in the 1960s
 Peter Hook bassist of the bands Joy Division and New Order
 Mick Hucknall lead singer of the band Simply Red
 Howard Jacobson Man Booker Prize-winning British Jewish author and journalist, best known for writing comic novels that often revolve around the dilemmas of British Jewish characters
 Davy Jones actor; singer of the band The Monkees
 Michelle Keegan actress on Coronation Street
 Brian Kidd football coach; assistant manager at Manchester City since December 2009; former player; assistant manager to Alex Ferguson at Manchester United in the 1990s; member of the Manchester United team that won the European Cup in 1968; born in Collyhurst
 Frank "Foo Foo" Lammar drag queen, born in Ancoats
 Harold Lever Labour politician and Baron Lever
 Emmanuel Levy (1900–1986) painter, teacher and art critic
 Martin Lewis Withington-born financial journalist who founded MoneySavingExpert.com 
 Harvey Lisbergmusic and sporting manager who discovered Herman's Hermits
 David Lloyd George born in Chorlton-in-Medlock; British Prime Minister during the First World War; member of the Liberal Party
 Sunny Lowry Longsight-born swimmer who was the first British woman to swim the English Channel
 Bernard Manning Ancoats-born stand-up comedian
 Sir Ernest Marples Postmaster-General and Minister of Transport; born in Levenshulme
 Johnny Marr songwriter, guitarist, keyboardist, harmonica player and singer, rose to fame in the 1980s as the guitarist in The Smiths
Ian McShane actor who grew up in Manchester
 Peter Mellor (born 1947) English-born American footballer and coach
 Mohyeldeen Mohammad Islamist activist who studied in Saudi Arabia prior to his deportation
 Steven Patrick Morrissey singer-songwriter in The Smiths, writer and poet. Born in Davyhulme, the singer rose to fame in the 1980s as the flamboyant frontman of rock band The Smiths
 Daniel Moult concert organist, organ tutor and animateur, ensemble player and presenter of films about music
 Gary Mounfield "Mani" is a bassist, formerly of The Stone Roses and later in Primal Scream

N–Z

 Doug Naylor comedy writer, known for creating the comedy series Red Dwarf
 Matt O'Connor  gender equality activist and found of Fathers 4 Justice
 Nigel Osborne composer, teacher and aid worker
 Jason Orange singer, songwriter, dancer, former member of Take That
 Emmeline Pankhurst suffragette, born in Moss Side
 Duncan Perry cricketer
 Anshel Pfeffer journalist
 Karl Pilkington podcaster, author and television presenter; known for his work with Ricky Gervais
 Fee Plumley digital artist
 John Charles Polanyi chemist, brought up in Manchester; won the 1986 Nobel Prize in Chemistry for his research in chemical kinetics
 Simon N. Powell (born 1955) born in Manchester; cancer researcher and radiation oncologist
 Thomas de Quincey (1785–1859) born in Manchester; author and intellectual; known for his Confessions of an English Opium-Eater (1821)
 Marcus Rashford footballer; plays for Manchester United and the England national team
 Lee Rigby of the 2nd Battalion of the Royal Regiment of Fusiliers; originally from Middleton, Greater Manchester; Lee, whilst off-duty and walking back to barracks, was killed by two Islamic extremists on 27 May 2013 as a terror attack
 Marc Riley musician; alternative rock critic and radio DJ on BBC 6 Music; former member of the Fall; had his own record label, In-Tape; also worked as a record plugger
 Andy Rourke bass guitarist best known for being a former member of the Smiths
 Lee Rourke novelist best known for The Canal, Vulgar Things and Glitch
 James Rowley  cricketer
 Shaun Ryder vocalist and songwriter with the Happy Mondays who became famous in the Madchester era
 Peter Saville Manchester-born artist and designer, best known for his work with Factory Records
Ceallach Spellman actor and presenter 
John Squire  guitarist with the Stone Roses
Paul Stenning  author, brought up in Davyhulme
 Nobby Stiles born in Collyhurst, former football midfielder Stiles, Bobby Charlton and Ian Callaghan are the only Englishmen to have won both World and European Cups
 Bernard Sumner singer-songwriter, guitarist, keyboard player and producer, best known as a founding member of two bands, Joy Division and New Order
 John Thaw actor; known for his roles in The Sweeney, Inspector Morse and Kavanagh QC; born in Longsight, brought up in Burnage
Katie Thistleton CBBC presenter and Radio 1 DJ
John Thomas recipient of the Victoria Cross
Edmund Thomson cricketer and British Army officer
 J. J. Thomson physicist and Nobel laureate; credited with the discovery of the electron and of isotopes, and the invention of the mass spectrometer; awarded the 1906 Nobel Prize in Physics for the discovery of the electron and his work on the conduction of electricity in gases
 Shayne Ward singer who won the second series of The X Factor
 Mabel Tylecote DBE adult educationnist
 Simon Webbe  singer/songwriter. Member of boyband Blue
 Danny Webber footballer, formerly of Manchester United and Sheffield United
 Danny Welbeck footballer who plays for Brighton & Hove Albion F.C.
 Sir Joseph Whitworth
 Andy Williams drummer and vocalist of the Doves
 Jez Williams guitarist/songwriter of the Doves
 Tony Wilson  co-founder of Factory Records and Granada Reports reporter
 Michael Wood historian and broadcaster; has presented numerous television documentary series, and made over 80 documentary films
 Alan Wren known as Reni; drummer of The Stone Roses

See also

 List of music artists and bands from Manchester

References

Bibliography

Manchester
Manchester
 
People from Manchester
Manchester